The 1998 President's Cup was a men's tennis tournament played on Hard in Tashkent, Uzbekistan that was part of the International Series of the 1998 ATP Tour. It was the second edition of the tournament and was held from 14 September – 20 September.

Finals

Singles

 Tim Henman defeated  Yevgeny Kafelnikov, 7–5, 6–4

Doubles

 Stefano Pescosolido /  Laurence Tieleman defeated  Kenneth Carlsen /  Sjeng Schalken, 7–5, 4–6, 7–5

References

President's Cup
ATP Tashkent Open
President's Cup
President's Cup